The Mangsee Islands are a group of two small islands in the far south west portion of the Philippines. The group comprises North Mangsee Island and South Mangsee Island. Together they form a barangay within the Balabac, a municipality of the province of Palawan. Based on the 2010 Census, the population of the Mangsee Islands was 8,433. By the time of the 2015 Census, the population has grown into 9,016.

History
Together with the Turtle Islands the barangay enjoys the historical distinction of being territory that was not under Philippine administration at the time of independence in 1946. This is due to their unique history. By an international treaty concluded in 1930 between the United States (in respect of its then overseas territory, the Philippine Islands) and the United Kingdom (in respect of its then protectorate, the State of North Borneo) the two powers agreed the international boundaries between those respective territories. In that treaty the United Kingdom also accepted that the Turtle Islands as well as the Mangsee Islands were part of the Philippines Archipelago and therefore under United States sovereignty. However, by a supplemental international treaty concluded at the same time, the two powers agreed that those islands, although part of the Philippines Archipelago, would remain under the administration of the State of North Borneo's British North Borneo Company. The supplemental treaty provided that the British North Borneo Company would continue to administer those islands unless and until the United States government gave notice to the United Kingdom calling for administration of the islands to be transferred to the United States. The United States never gave such a notice. On 4 July 1946, the Republic of the Philippines was born. It became the successor to the United States under the treaties of 1930. On 15 July 1946, the United Kingdom annexed the State of North Borneo and, in the view of the United Kingdom, became the sovereign power with respect to what had been the State of North Borneo. On 19 September 1946, the Republic of the Philippines notified the United Kingdom that it wished to take over the administration of the Turtle Islands and the Mangsee Islands. Pursuant to a supplemental international agreement, the transfer of administration became effective on 16 October 1947.

Geography and society
The islands are situated in the Sulu Sea at the south-western tip of the country, at the edge of the international treaty limits separating the Philippines and Malaysia. South Mangsee Island is the larger of the two islands but is tiny measuring just 23 square hectares. With a population of nearly 9,000, mostly ethnic Sama Muslims, the islands are very densely populated. South Mangsee is home to the majority of the population as well as governmental institutions such as an elementary school established in 1975. Mangsee is closer to Sabah, Malaysia, than to the southernmost Palawan town of Balabac to which it belongs administratively. There have been issues with the safety of the islands' water supply. In 2000, Mangsee was hit by an epidemic that killed around 200 people in a span of about two weeks, in what was believed to be caused by cholera. As of 2012, the barangay still did not have a resident doctor. Due to the problems, most of the islands inhabitants seek treatment to neighbouring Banggi Island in Sabah. Smuggling to and from Malaysia, as well as fishing, are important economic activities in Mangsee.

Accessibility
Access to the Mangsee Islands is difficult, as there are no regular means of transportation to the area.

References

Islands of Palawan
Landforms of the Sulu Sea